Keshia Chanté Harper (born June 16, 1988) is a Canadian singer, television host, actress, songwriter, philanthropist and businesswoman. As a teenager, Chanté gained recognition with the release of her singles "Unpredictable", "Bad Boy" and "Does He Love Me" "Been Gone" "2U" and "Fallen" featuring Drake and has since released four albums. In 2013, she rose to international prominence as co-host of BET's 106 & Park with Bow Wow which launched her career as a TV Host & Television Personality. Chante is also known as Drake's musical muse who he refers to as "KIKI" in his song In My Feelings.

Chanté made history as the youngest Juno Award winner and is a 7-time nominee, and has won five Canadian Urban Music Awards and two Canadian Radio Music Awards. Chanté was given a star on the Brampton Arts Walk of Fame for her achievements in Canadian Music & Film. Chanté has had many #1 singles on radio in both Canada & Japan, as well as eight Top 10 singles on the radio music charts. She has earned multiple SOCAN No. 1 Awards for her songwriting efforts. Her single "Table Dancer" hit #1 on the Billboard Japan Digital Chart and #9 on the Billboard Japan Hot 100.

Chanté won a Canadian Screen Award for Best TV Host. She rose to international prominence having hosted 106 & Park with Bow Wow for two years. She has conducted interviews with many high-profile celebrities, including Michelle Obama, Robert De Niro, Kim Kardashian, Jennifer Aniston, Drake, Jennifer Lopez, Dwayne Johnson, Kevin Hart, Morgan Freeman, Larry King, Arnold Schwarzenegger, Kelsey Grammer, Mark Wahlberg, Cate Blanchett, Mariah Carey, and Denzel Washington.

Chante has served as an international music judge on The World's Best, and currently hosts  Entertainment Tonight Canada and ETC Live in California. Chanté has hosted, judged and appeared on numerous shows including the BET Awards, Peak of the Week on Paramount+, Let's KIKI, Big Brother's Aftershow, Battle of the Blades, The Next Star, Top Chef Canada, Chopped Canada and Match Game

As a philanthropist and humanitarian, Chanté has donated and raised millions of dollars with multiple organizations and causes, including WE Charity, Canadian Foundation for AIDS Research, Joyful Heart Foundation and World Vision International. Chanté also hosted We Day and is a motivational speaker advocating for Mental Health awareness.

As an actress, Chanté is a recurring guest star on TV series' Jann and Private Eyes.

Chante is the founder of hair brand KHAIR

Early life 
Keshia Chanté Harper was born and raised in Ottawa, Ontario and spent summers with her grandparents in Hinesville, Georgia. At age 12 Chanté moved to Toronto, Ontario. Her father is Afro-Trinidadian and her mother is Puerto Rican and Portuguese Chanté is an only child. She was 6 years old when she first performed, receiving a standing ovation for her rendition of Dear Mama by Tupac Shakur. Through talent shows, she got the attention of a local DJ who, in 2002, sent a video of her performance to SonyMusic Canada. After performing for music executives, she was signed to the label to release her music exclusively in Canada. She went to middle school at St. Peter Catholic High School before moving to Toronto, Ontario at the age of 12. Chanté was valedictorian and graduated with honors.

Career

2003–2012: Singer and actor
In 2002, at the age of 13, SonyMusic Canada signed Chanté to a long term record contract to release her music in Canada. In early 2003, she released "Shook (The Answer)", a response track to Shawn Desman's song Shook, which won an Urban Music Award for "Best Pop/R&B Single". The follow-up, "Unpredictable" went No. 3 on radio charts, and her first video hit number one on YTV and the top ten on MuchMusic. In November 2003, the CD single of "Unpredictable" was certified gold and later went on to win Chanté the Canadian Radio Music Award for "Best New Solo Artist".

In early February 2004, Chanté's third single, "Bad Boy", was released. It was also successful, breaking the Top 10 on radio and sitting at No. 3 on MuchMusic for 4 weeks before later earning the No. 1 position on the chart. The video was directed by Director X. Later, in June 2004, Chanté's fourth single "Does He Love Me?" ft. Foxy Brown reached top 5 at radio. The video was also directed by Director X and became No. 1 on MuchMusic for 3 weeks. The video also garnered her an Urban Music Video Award for "Video of the Year". On June 22, 2004, Chanté released her self-titled debut album. On December 3, 2004 it was certified gold. In October 2004, at the Canadian Urban Music Awards Chanté swept all three of her nominations, winning awards for "Best New Artist", "Video of the Year" (for Bad Boy), "Fans' Choice Award" and by surprise taking home the "Rising Star of the Year" award. This brought the attention of the President of BET, Stephen Hill, who became Chanté's mentor and putting the video for "Bad Boy" into heavy rotation.  In that same month, she sang the national anthem at the Canadian Football League's Grey Cup championship game. She was also selected to represent Canada at Expo 2005 held in Japan.

In July 2005, Chanté went on a cross-Canada tour and later opened up for Destiny's Child during the Canadian leg of their Destiny Fulfilled ... And Lovin' It tour, and is also included on the Destiny's Child Live in Atlanta Tour DVD. In October 2005, Chanté received four nominations at the Urban Music Awards. In 2006, Chanté toured with Teen People Magazine and Seventeen Magazine across select cities in the U.S. In July 2006, Chanté released her new single "Been Gone" with a video shot by Director X (marking her third collaboration with him). Her second single, "2U" was released in early November. Also in 2006, Chanté made a featured cameo appearance in Bow Wow and Chris Brown's music video "Shortie Like Mine". Her second album, which Chanté executive produced, was released on December 5, 2006 in Canada and Japan through SonyMusic Canada. MTV's "The Diary of Keshia Chanté" aired in Canada December 6, 2006, showing footage following Chanté as she travelled to Miami and LA working on her album.

In 2007, during her last year of high school, Chanté took a departure from music to study to learn more about the music business and be mentored by respected entertainment lawyers in LA and Toronto. She later made the decision to move to Atlanta and West Hollywood, where she worked closely the camps of Ne-Yo, Missy Elliott and OutKast. She began honing her skill as a songwriter and her acting chops, starring as the lead actress in the TV series "Soul".

In 2010, Chanté released her third album "Night & Day" in Canada through Universal Music Canada.
Chanté released "Table Dancer" and "Test Drive"  which were both nominated for Juno Awards; R&B Recording of the Year for "Test Drive" and Dance Recording of the Year for "Table Dancer". Both songs entered Top 10 at radio. On February 14, 2011, Chanté released the Taio Cruz penned song "Set U Free". On December 31, 2011, Chanté performed on ET Canada's New Year's Eve Bash in Niagara Falls, which later set a record becoming Canada's No. 1 Year End Countdown Show with 4.8 million viewers. In April 2012, Chanté was announced as the new music judge for a music competition show on YTV called The Next Star. On the week of November 28, 2012, Chante's first single release "Table Dancer" went No. 1 on the Billboard Charts in Japan and No. 6 on Hot 100, No. 3 on Digital & Airplay & No. 11 on regular charts Chanté guest starred & judged on TV shows Top Chef Canada and Canada's Best Beauty Talent with supermodel Coco Rocha & Flare Magazine's Editor-in-Chief Lisa Tant

2013–2015: TV personality BET's 106 and Park
On June 14, 2012, Chanté made her US television debut on BET's 106 & Park as a co-host on two separate occasions co-hosting with Terrence J. On June 30, 2013, Chanté attended the 2013 BET Awards as a correspondent for the event & began co-hosting select episodes of 106 & Park. On September 26, 2013, BET President Stephen Hill announced on the Rickey Smiley Morning Show that Chanté will be a new co host for 106 & Park alongside rapper Bow Wow starting on October 1. Childhood friend and fellow Canadian Drake publicly announced and congratulated Chanté for becoming the first ever Canadian to host the iconic show. Chanté went on to make history having the First Lady of the United States Michelle Obama on the show, as well as filming with the likes of Mariah Carey, Jennifer Lopez, Mark Wahlberg, Sylvester Stallone, Denzel Washington, Jessica Alba, Arnold Schwarzenegger, Robert De Niro, Will Ferrell, Eminem, The Rock, Floyd Mayweather, Forest Whitaker, 50 Cent, Kerry Washington, Tyra Banks, Naomi Campbell, Kevin Hart, Melissa McCarthy, Emma Stone, Joe Manganiello, and many more.

On December 18, 2013, Chanté was invited by United States President Barack Obama & the first lady Michelle Obama to their White House holiday party in DC. In December 2014, received a star on the Brampton Arts Walk of Fame. In January 2015, after two years hosting 106 & Park, the show announced it was going digital. In June 2014, 2015 and 2016, Chanté hosted the BET Awards 106 & Park Pre-Show in LA.

2016–present: California 
On November 11, 2016, BET premiered Chante's song "The Valley" off her upcoming album. On January 11, 2017, Radio Host Ebro Darden debuted Chanté's single "Fuck It Tho" on his Beats 1 radio show on Apple Music. On March 22, Ebro Darden announced Keshia Chante's track listing for Unbound 01 and premiered "Bryson Tiller" exclusively with Apple Music on the Beats 1 radio show. On March 23, Noisey premiered "RedLight", citing the track as "the sonic equivalent of a cool, still night: beautiful but there is something eerie in its midst, hidden in the dark" and AUX TV premiered "Harmless" citing that Chanté is "re-igniting her signature R&B sound" and that "Chanté’s soaring vocals lend the track a distinctly modern edge". On March 24, 2017 Chanté released Unbound 01, an EP and in February 2018 it was nominated for a Juno Award for Best R&B Recording.  Unbound 02 was released March 23, 2018.

In 2017, Chanté moved to West Hollywood, California and began acting school.

In August 2018, it was announced Chanté would be a Celebrity Hollywood Correspondent for Entertainment Tonight Canada and she has since conducted interviews with Larry King, Cate Blanchett, Anne Hathaway, Christian Bale, Matthew McConaughey, Tyra Banks, Jamie Lee Curtis, Trevor Noah, Charlie Hunnam, Rami Malek and many more.

In November 2018, Chanté hosted We Day in Washington, Baltimore, Edmonton, Calgary and Ottawa for WE Charity. Chanté gave a motivational speech in front of 17,000 youths at WE Day in Vancouver advocating for mental health and sharing her personal experience with depression and anxiety. She also interviewed Kareem Abdul-Jabbar. In January 2019, Chanté served as an international judge on The World's Best as an expert in the field of music. On July 22, 2019, it was announced that Chanté would return to acting by joining the cast of Private Eyes. On October 1, 2019, it was announced that Chanté would guest star in JANN. On August 7, 2020, Big Brother announced Chanté as host of their Official Big Brother (American TV series) Aftershow, BB Rewind On October 1, 2020, DeSean Jackson released a single titled "Girlfriend" featuring Chanté. On October 16, it was announced that Keshia would host Battle of the Blades with Ron MacLean.

In February 2023, Chante announced she founded a clean, luxury, inclusive hair care brand called KHAIR.

Artistry

Musical style
Tara Henley of The Georgia Straight noted that Chanté had "an arresting voice, magnetic charisma, and driving ambition." Denise Sheppard from Amazon.ca also noted, "[Chanté is] a teen-targeted pop phenom" whose "music has the one-two punch of melodic hooks and the voice to back them up; a combination that can and will appeal to dance/pop music fans of any age.

Influences
Chanté cited Beyoncé, Aaliyah and Brandy as her childhood influences, as well as Tupac Shakur, with whom she shares the same birthday.

Public image
Chanté has been cited for having an eerily striking resemblance to late singer Aaliyah, often cited as her doppelganger. Both noted by Missy Elliot and Timbaland who mentioned the resemblance on 106 & Park. Chanté was set to play Aaliyah in the biopic film but Chante declined after speaking with Aaliyah's mother who was against the film being made.

In Canada, Chanté is considered a Fashionista by fashion's high rankings, performing at Marchesa's first runway show in Toronto, as well as Chanel event for Toronto International Film Festival. Her style has been described as "glamorous" meets "sexy elegance" by Holt Renfrew executives.
Chanté is an avid supporter of Canadian Fashion Designers and labels. Flare Magazine has named her a "true style chameleon" In January 2012, Fashion Television labeled Keshia a Fashion Icon In 2012, Chanté served as a Judge on Canada's Best Beauty Talent with Coco Rocha and Editor-in-Chief of FLARE Magazine Lisa Tant.

Personal life

Drake 
Chanté is rapper Drake's first girlfriend and first love  often cited as his "muse". They dated in Toronto during their teen years, have collaborated musically and continued to date off and on until their break up. Drake has written multiple songs about Chanté, most famously "In My Feelings" where he confirmed her as "KIKI"  and including songs like Wu-Tang Forever, "U With Me?" off his 2016 album Views, "Madonna" from his 2015 mixtape If You're Reading This It's Too Late" and "Wait for U". Many speculated on the identity of Kiki, however Drake's artist, Preme confirmed it on Instagram. Drake discussed their relationship while featured on Chanté's song titled "Fallen", rapping "Keshia, Keshia, do you remember the old us?/You just hold it down for your boy until the plaques arrive that's why I love you". Drake also speaks of Chanté in the second verse of his song "Deceiving" referencing Chante's mother, Tessa "What up Tessa, I love you like my own mama/And your daughter's getting grown, mama/And me, I'm just here working, waiting/patient for her to be ready to love and leave alone drama."

In 2009, Drake was asked by MuchMusic's VJ Sarah Taylor on his past relationship with Chanté to which Drake stated he is "proud to call [Chanté] an ex-girlfriend".

On October 1, 2013, Drake told Chanté on an episode of 106 & Park, "You were one of my first crushes, and a lot of people might not know this, but I actually rapped about you before." He later was a part of a commercial announcing Chanté as the new official TV Host of 106 & Park.

On July 26, 2022 Drake announced a live concert with Chante as a performer for OVO World Weekend Festival in Toronto called "All Canadian North Stars", highlighting Chante as one of the artists who "paved the way for all of us" 

On July 28, 2022 at OVO Fest in Toronto, Drake introduced Chante to the world, saying "This next person coming to the stage, I used to get into my mom's car. I used to drive all the way to the west for this donna right here, you feel me? So, I have to personally introduce her. This is my first girlfriend I ever had in my life coming to the stage. A real legend. Somebody I love with all my heart. Make some noise for Keshia Chanté"  Chante called it the "most heartfelt & meaningful introduction".

Ray Emery 
In June 2010, Chanté began dating NHL netminder Ray Emery, announcing their relationship when Emery starred as the love interest in Chanté's Test Drive music video. Their relationship was featured in the series Hockey Wives. On June 16, 2016, Emery proposed to Chanté on her birthday with friends in Nassau, Bahamas. Emery and Chanté were set to wed June 2017, however, simultaneously with the release of her cover on Today's Bride, Chanté announced via her Instagram that she called off the wedding. On September 18, 2017, TMZ reported Emery was arrested for uttering threats and assault with a weapon towards Chanté, after she went to the police seeking a restraining order. Chanté required Emery to attend anger management in exchange for charges being absolved, in which Emery agreed and successfully completed. On July 16, 2018, two days after his accidental drowning, Chanté penned an emotional tribute to Emery stating that she was "heartbroken" and that he was "a Superhero" who was "loving, affectionate, intelligent, hilarious, giving". She also stated that they "may have had differences" but they "forgave each other and continued to love each other right to the very end."

On December 18, 2013, Chanté was invited by United States President Barack Obama and the first lady Michelle Obama to their White House holiday party in DC.

Chanté resides in both West Hollywood, California and Toronto, Ontario.

Other ventures

Philanthropy
Chanté served as youth ambassador for CANFAR (Canadian Foundation for AIDS Research) traveling to Kenya, Africa to build schools and visited schools across Canada to raise awareness. She has visited Dominican Republic to work with World Vision and has worked with Alicia Keys to throw a fundraising concert for the Stephen Lewis Foundation. In 2014, Chanté starred in NBC's PSA for Mariska Hargitay's Joyful Heart foundation alongside Eli Manning, Hilary Swank and more to raise awareness on domestic violence. Chanté hosted We Day Calgary and Ottawa, as well as spoke in front of 16,000 youth for Vancouver on her passion to raise awareness on mental health issues like depression and anxiety.

Endorsements
Chanté has been endorsed by brands such as CANON, Pepsi, Bacardi, Nestlé, Bell, Rogers, Stila Cosmetics, MAC Cosmetics, Ecko Red and Sony. In November 2010, Chanté became the face of Pepsi and their Pepsi Refresh Project campaign. In 2007, Chanté served as the face of Ontario Tourism and sang the theme song in their commercials.

Discography

Studio albums
Keshia Chanté (2004)
2U (2006)
Night & Day (2011)
Unbound 02 (2018)

EP
Unbound 01 (2017)

Filmography

Awards and nominations
2003
Canadian Urban Music Award for Best R&B/Soul Single for "Shook (The Answer)" – Won
Canadian Radio Music Award for "Best New Solo Artist" (Dance Urban Rhythmic) – Won
Canadian Radio Music Award for "Best New Solo Artist" (CHR) – Won-

2004
Canadian Urban Music Award for Best New Artist – Won
Canadian Urban Music Award for Video of the Year for "Bad Boy" – Won
Canadian Urban Music Award for Fans Choice – Won
Rising Star Award for Rising Star of the Year – Won
MuchMusic Video Award for "Best R&B Video" for "Does He Love Me?" – Won

2005
Juno Award for "R&B/Soul Recording of the Year" – Won
Juno Award for "New Artist of the Year"  – Nominee
Canadian Urban Music Award for "Video of the Year" for "Does He Love Me?"  – Won
MuchMusic Video Award for "People's Choice: Favorite Canadian Artist" – Won
MuchMusic Video Award for "Best Pop Video" for "Does He Love Me?" – Won

2007
Juno Award for "R&B/SOUL Recording Of The Year" for "Been Gone"  – Nominee

2008
Juno Award for "R&B/SOUL Recording of the Year" for "2U"   – Nominee

2011
Juno Award for "Dance Recording of the Year" for "Table Dancer" – Nominee
Juno Award for "R&B/SOUL Recording of the Year" for "Test Drive" – Nominee
2018

 Juno Award for "R&B/SOUL Recording of the Year" for "Unbound 01" (EP) – Nominee
2022

 Canadian Screen Award for Best TV Show Host for "ET Canada" - Winner

References

External links

 
 
 
 
 

1988 births
Living people
21st-century Black Canadian women singers
21st-century Canadian actresses
Actresses from Ottawa
Actresses from Toronto
Black Canadian actresses
Black Canadian dancers
Canadian expatriate actresses in the United States
Canadian expatriate musicians in the United States
Canadian contemporary R&B singers
Canadian female dancers
Canadian female models
Canadian film actresses
Canadian philanthropists
Canadian people of Portuguese descent
Canadian people of Puerto Rican descent
Canadian people of Trinidad and Tobago descent
Canadian television actresses
Canadian television hosts
Canadian women singer-songwriters
Canadian women television hosts
Female models from Ontario
Juno Award for R&B/Soul Recording of the Year winners
Musicians from Ottawa
Musicians from Toronto